Lars Bom (Olesen) (born 8 April 1961) is a Danish actor, educated at The Danish National School of Theatre in 1985. Lars Bom has worked in various roles in Theatre, Film and Television, and won the Best Actor award at the Italian Fantafestival in 1999, for his starring role in the cyberpunk-thriller Skyggen (1998). However, he is best known for his roles in Strisser på Samsø and Rejseholdet.

Besides acting, Lars Bom is also passionate about running and has released a DVD/book about it in 2007.

Selected filmography

External links

1961 births
Living people
People from Gladsaxe Municipality
Danish male actors